Charlotte County is a United States county located in the south central part of the Commonwealth of Virginia. Its county seat is the town of Charlotte Court House.  As of the 2020 census, the county population was 11,529. Charlotte County is predominantly rural with a population density of only 26.5 persons per square mile.

History

European settlement of the future county began in the early 18th century, and early settlers included mostly English people, with some French Huguenots, and Scotch-Irish., and a modest population of Germans.  After approximately fifty years of European settlement, the House of Burgesses established and incorporated Charlotte County in 1764 from part of Lunenburg County.  The new county was named in honor of Charlotte of Mecklenburg-Strelitz, the Queen and wife of King George III of Great Britain.
The county residents later became staunch supporters of independence and the American Revolution, and Founding Father Patrick Henry was one of its most famous residents.  His grave and the national memorial dedicated to him are located in Charlotte County.
Residents of Charlotte County were heavily involved in the American Revolution.  County delegates supported resolutions against the Stamp Act of 1765, and the county government was the second governing body to declare independence from English rule.  In addition, Charlotte militia units fought under General Robert Lawson during the Yorktown campaign, which effectively led to the end of the American War of Independence.  Finally, the final resting place and national memorial to revolutionary hero Patrick Henry is at Red Hill Plantation.

Charlotte County has also played a role in other wars on American soil.  An artillery company from Charlotte played a key role in the Battle of Craney Island during the War of 1812.  Also, a significant battle in the American Civil War occurred in Charlotte and Halifax counties during the Battle of Staunton River Bridge, which resulted in a victory for the Confederacy.

Geography
The county is bounded on the southwest by the Roanoke River, locally known as the "Staunton River". The terrain is hilly.

Adjacent counties

Prince Edward County – north
Lunenburg County – east
Mecklenburg County – southeast
Halifax County – southwest
Campbell County – west
Appomattox County – northwest

Major highways
 (Farmville Rd on the extreme northside of the county; joins US 360 in Keysville and separates in Wylliesburg
 (Kings Hwy)
 (Lunenburg County Rd on the extreme eastside; Front St & Church St in Keysville; George Washington Hwy; joins SR 47 in Charlotte Court House and becomes David Bruce Ave; Patrick Henry Hwy)
 (Thomas Jefferson Hwy; forks from SR 40 and becomes LeGrande Ave; Tollhouse Hwy; Drakes Main St in Drakes Branch; Craftons Gate Hwy
 (Highway Fifty-Nine)
 (Jeb Stuart Hwy)

Demographics

2020 census

Note: the US Census treats Hispanic/Latino as an ethnic category. This table excludes Latinos from the racial categories and assigns them to a separate category. Hispanics/Latinos can be of any race.

2000 Census
As of the census of 2000, there were 12,472 people, 4,951 households, and 3,435 families residing in the county.  The population density was 26 people per square mile (10/km2).  There were 5,734 housing units at an average density of 12 per square mile (5/km2).  The racial makeup of the county was 65.51% White, 32.89% Black or African American, 0.14% Native American, 0.16% Asian, 0.70% from other races, and 0.59% from two or more races.  1.65% of the population were Hispanic or Latino of any race.

There were 4,951 households, out of which 28.10% had children under the age of 18 living with them, 52.50% were married couples living together, 13.00% had a female householder with no husband present, and 30.60% were non-families. 27.40% of all households were made up of individuals, and 13.30% had someone living alone who was 65 years of age or older.  The average household size was 2.47 and the average family size was 3.00.

In the county, the age distribution of the population shows 24.30% under the age of 18, 7.20% from 18 to 24, 26.20% from 25 to 44, 24.80% from 45 to 64, and 17.50% who were 65 years of age or older.  The median age was 40 years. For every 100 females there were 92.00 males.  For every 100 females age 18 and over, there were 90.70 males.

The median income for a household in the county was $28,929, and the median income for a family was $34,830. Males had a median income of $26,918 versus $20,307 for females. The per capita income for the county was $14,717.  About 12.70% of families and 18.10% of the population were below the poverty line, including 22.10% of those under age 18 and 20.80% of those age 65 or over.

Elected officials

Board of Supervisors
Gary D. Walker (R), District A – Charlotte Court House, Chairman — Term expires 12-31-23
Kay M. Pierantoni, District B - Wylliesburg/Red Oak — Term expires 12-31-21
Garland H. "Butch" Hamlett, Jr. (I), District C – Drakes Branch— Term expires 12-31-23
Robert L. "Butch" Shook, Jr. (I), District D – Keysville — Term expires 12-31-21
M. Anthony “Tony” Reeves, District E - Cullen/Red House — Term expires 12-31-23
Donna L. Fore, District F – Aspen/Phenix — Term expires 12-31-21
Will D. Garnett, District G – Bacon/Saxe, Vice-Chairman — Term expires 12-31-23

The Board of Supervisors is the legislative policy making body for the county. It considers and adopts policies regarding administration, budget, finance, economic development, health, planning, public safety, childcare, recreation, sanitation and waste removal. The Board appropriates funds for all functions, including the schools, Social Services, Law Enforcement and operation of courts. The Board's regularly scheduled meetings are held on the second Tuesday of each month at 1:30 pm in the Board of Supervisors Room of the County Administration Building, 250 LeGrande Avenue, Suite A, (PO Box 608) Charlotte Court House, Virginia, 23923.

Sheriff
Royal Freeman (I) is the sheriff.  The Sheriff is responsible for overseeing criminal investigations, calls for service, court room security, service of civil process and the operation of the Charlotte County jail.

Clerk of Court
The clerk is Nan R. Colley (I).  The Charlotte County Clerk of the Circuit Court manages the records for the Judicial Circuit. In addition, Colley manages the records for the Judicial Circuit and serves as general record keeper for the county, recording all documents relating to land transfers, deeds, mortgages, wills, divorces and other statistics that date back to 1765.

Commissioner of the Revenue
Naisha P. Carter (I) is the Commissioner of the Revenue.

Commonwealth's Attorney
William E. Green, Jr. (I) is the Commonwealth's Attorney, a position similar to that of District's Attorney in many other states.

Treasurer
Patricia P. Berkeley (I) is the Treasurer.

County Administrator
Charlotte County's administrator is Daniel Witt.  Clark's duties include and are not limited to: general administration, personnel management and supervision of all county departments, budget preparation, funds management, purchasing, property management, compliance with laws, regulations and ordinances, coordination with independent agencies and the community, representing the Board at meetings and functions, and any and all other duties imposed by the Board and by law to facilitate the accomplishment of the work of county government.

Members of the School Board
Carmalita Escoto, District A (Charlotte Court House)
William "Bill" Devin, District B (Wylliesburg/Red Oak)
Gloria Talbott, District C (Drakes Branch)
R.B. "Jay" George (Vice Chairman), District D (Keysville)
Scotty Hamlett, District E (Cullen/Red House)
Robert Johnson, District F (Phenix/Aspen)
JonPaul Berkley (Chairperson), District B (Bacon/Saxe) 
Dana Ramsey, Clerk of the Board

Voter Registrar
Virginia Booth

Communities

Towns
Charlotte Court House
Drakes Branch
Keysville
Phenix

Unincorporated
Abilene
Cullen
Harrisburg
Madisonville
Randolph
Red House
Red Oak
Wren
Wylliesburg

Notable residents
David K. E. Bruce – diplomat and politician
Isaac Dabbs – politician
Patrick Henry – politician and Founding Father
William Hoffman- famous author
John McCargo- former NFL player for the Buffalo Bills
John Randolph – politician
Joe Reed- NFL player for the Los Angeles Chargers
A. Leo Weil – lawyer

See also
National Register of Historic Places listings in Charlotte County, Virginia

References

External links
Charlotte County
County History

 
Virginia counties
1764 establishments in Virginia
Populated places established in 1764